The Skyland Conference is a New Jersey high school sports association under the jurisdiction of the New Jersey State Interscholastic Athletic Association (NJSIAA). The conference is made up of 22 public and parochial high schools covering Hunterdon County, Somerset County and Warren County in west central New Jersey. 

Hackettstown High School left the conference during the 2009 NJSIAA realignments to join the Northwest Jersey Athletic Conference. North Warren Regional High School opted to leave the Skyland Conference at the end of the 2011-12 school year, also to join the NJAC.

There is no football competition within the Skyland Conference.  Instead, member schools which compete in football are part of the Big Central Football Conference.

Member schools
Belvidere High School
Bernards High School
Bound Brook High School
Bridgewater-Raritan High School
Delaware Valley Regional High School
Franklin High School
Gill St. Bernard's School
Hillsborough High School
Hunterdon Central Regional High School
Immaculata High School
Manville High School
Montgomery High School
Mount St. Mary Academy
North Hunterdon High School
North Plainfield High School
Phillipsburg High School
Ridge High School
Rutgers Preparatory School
Pingry School
Somerville High School
South Hunterdon Regional High School
Voorhees High School
Warren Hills Regional High School
Warren County Technical School, entering in 2018-2019
Watchung Hills Regional High School

Sports
Fall sports: football, field hockey, cheerleading, gymnastics, cross country, soccer, women's tennis, and women's volleyball.
Winter sports: bowling, fencing, basketball, track & field, ice hockey, swimming, and wrestling.
Spring sports: golf, fast pitch softball, track & field, baseball, lacrosse, men's tennis, and men's volleyball.

References

External links
Skyland Conference
New Jersey State Interscholastic Athletic Association

New Jersey high school athletic conferences
Hunterdon County, New Jersey
Somerset County, New Jersey
Warren County, New Jersey